Valentin Demyanenko, born 23 October 1983 in Cherkasy, is a former Ukrainian-born Azerbaijani flatwater canoeist. He is a four times world champion, three times European champion and silver medalist of 2016 Summer Olympics in C-1 200 metres.

Career
Demyanenko was a late developer and only came to prominence in 2004 with a shock victory in the C-1 500m final at the European under-23 championships in Poznań, Poland. His time of under 1:50 was comparable with those recorded by the finalists at the Athens Olympics.

In 2005 his coaches judged he was ready to take on the seniors but no one expected what was to follow. In his first international appearance as a senior he won a silver medal at the 2005 European championships in the C-1 200m sprint, just one tenth of a second behind the three-times champion Maxim Opalev of Russia.

The following month, at the 2005 Flatwater Racing World Championships at Zagreb, Croatia, he was entered in two events. In the C-1 500m he came fourth. Then in the C-1 200m final he turned the tables on Opalev, winning the final in a time of 39.264 seconds.

After these successes Demyanenko began to concentrate on the C1 500m in preparation for the 2008 Summer Olympics, where there would be no 200m races. He didn't appear at the 2006 European Senior Championships; instead he was entered for the under-23 championships in Schinias, Greece, where he won the C1 500m silver medal. At the senior World Championships in Szeged, Hungary, however he returned to the 200m distance to defend his title. This time he finished in the silver medal position. In both events he was beaten by Russia's Nikolay Lipkin.

References

External links
 
 
 

Living people
1983 births
Sportspeople from Cherkasy
Ukrainian male canoeists
Azerbaijani male canoeists
Canoeists at the 2012 Summer Olympics
Canoeists at the 2016 Summer Olympics
Olympic canoeists of Azerbaijan
ICF Canoe Sprint World Championships medalists in Canadian
European Games medalists in canoeing
Canoeists at the 2015 European Games
European Games silver medalists for Azerbaijan
Ukrainian emigrants to Azerbaijan
Naturalized citizens of Azerbaijan
Olympic silver medalists for Azerbaijan
Olympic medalists in canoeing
Medalists at the 2016 Summer Olympics